Kuffert-Sørensen was established in 1829 and is Denmark's oldest leather goods company. In 1829 Carl Peter Sørensen (1799-1863) opened his shop at Børsen. He was the founder of Kuffert-Sørensen.

Kuffert-Sørensen today has five shops in the Copenhagen area and a B2B department outside Copenhagen. From 1970 two members of the fifth generation, Jens Erlang Sørensen and Esther Sørensen, have taken over helped by their daughters Sanne and Helle, who are interested in continuing the family tradition.

External links 
 Kuffert Sørensen Official homepage
 Kuffert Sørensen Customer review

Retail companies of Denmark
Danish companies established in 1829